Westra Wermlands Sparbank is a savings bank providing services in Värmland County. The bank is subject to the Bank Act and is independent, but has a close coroparation with Swedbank.

Its business area includes Arvika (headquarters), Eda and Årjäng municipalities serving via seven offices. The bank has over 100 employees and is an active member of the Savings Banks Association.

The Westra Wermlands Sparbank was founded in Arvika in 1856.

References 

Article contains translated text from Westra Wermlands Sparbank on the Swedish Wikipedia retrieved on 12 March 2017.

External links 
Homepage

Banks of Sweden
Banks established in 1856
Swedish companies established in 1856